Bucculatrix thurberiella, the cotton leaf perforator, is a species of moth of the family Bucculatricidae. It was first described by August Busck in 1914. It is native to the south-western United States and northern Mexico. It is an introduced species in Hawaii.

The wingspan is 7–9 mm. The forewings are white, but the extreme costal margin from the base to beyond the middle is blackish. The hindwings are pale whitish ocherous.

The larvae feed on Gossypium tomentosum and Thurberia thespesioides. They mine the leaves of their host plant. The mine is mainly on the upper surface and progresses tortuously, ever widening. When the first instar is about completed an exit hole is cut through the upper epidermis and the larva leaves the inner tissue. When the feeding activities of this stage are finished the larva weaves a tiny circular web over some slight depression on the underside of the leaf. Second- and third-instar larvae feed on either the upper or the under surface.

References

External links

Bucculatricidae
Moths described in 1914
Moths of North America
Introduced animals of Hawaii